Valkyria Chronicles is a series of military-themed tactical role-playing video games created by Ryutaro Nonaka and Shuntaro Tanaka, and developed by Sega. The series began with Valkyria Chronicles, which was released for the PlayStation 3 in 2008, and later for Microsoft Windows, PlayStation 4 and the Nintendo Switch. Two sequels have been released on the PlayStation Portable, with the latest installment, Valkyria Chronicles 4, released for the PlayStation 4, Xbox One, Nintendo Switch and Microsoft Windows. The series has also been expanded into anime and manga media.

Settings, gameplay, and characters

The main line of games uses a turn based system known as the BLiTZ (Battle of Live Tactical Zones), while the later installment is described as being real time with strategy elements. The setting resembles an alternate version of Earth during the early 20th century. Welkin Gunther is the main protagonist of the first game, Valkyria Chronicles. Selvaria Bles is a character that has appeared in every single installment, with the exception of Valkyria Revolution.

Games
Valkyria Chronicles debuted on PlayStation 3, with the original game later made available on Microsoft Windows, PlayStation 4 and Nintendo Switch. Sega opted to continue the series on PlayStation Portable instead of on PlayStation 3. However, Valkyria Chronicles 4 was released on the PlayStation 4, Xbox One, Microsoft Windows and Nintendo Switch, it was the first Valkyria Chronicles game to debut on a Nintendo platform and Microsoft Windows in the West.

Main series

Valkyria Chronicles

The first main entry in the series was originally released for the PlayStation 3 and later ported to Microsoft Windows, PlayStation 4, and Nintendo Switch. The Windows port was developed by Little Stone Software. It takes place in Europa, a fictional continent based on Europe, during the beginning of World War II. Because of its abundance of Ragnite ore, which takes the place of petroleum in the game setting, the neutral nation of Gallia comes under attack from the East Europan Imperial Alliance, which is itself engaged in a war with the Atlantic Federation. Players take control of a unit of the Gallian Militia, dedicated to repelling the invasion. The game's visuals, which use Sega's CANVAS graphics engine, resemble pencil drawn paintings in motion.

Valkyria Chronicles II

The second main entry was moved to the PlayStation Portable platform. Story-wise, it takes place two years after the events of the first game, with a fight that breaks loose against the Gallian Revolutionary Army and the Regular Army in a bid to remove Cordelia from the throne. The game's story focuses on a military academy as its cadets seek to prevent an ethnic cleansing campaign by a ruthless rebel group.

Valkyria Chronicles III

The third main entry was also released on the PlayStation Portable. However, it takes place during the events of the first game. The story follows the "Nameless", a penal military unit serving the nation of Gallia during the Second Europan War who perform secret black operations and are pitted against the Imperial unit "Calamity Raven". Unlike the previous installments, it did not have an official release outside of Japan.

Valkyria Chronicles 4

The fourth main entry was released on the PC, PlayStation 4, Xbox One, and Nintendo Switch in 2018. While taking place during the events of the first and third game, Valkyria Chronicles 4 focuses not on the Gallian forces but those of the Atlantic Federation, the other major superpower during the events of the war, that enacts a bold plan to strike at the imperial capital.

Spinoffs

Valkyria Chronicles D
Valkyria Chronicles D is a mobile game released only in Japan. It was a free browser-based/iOS game, with radically different gameplay, focusing more on character management of war troops similar to sports team management simulations. It was released on July 26, 2012 and shut down on April 22, 2015.

Valkyria Revolution

Valkyria Revolution (known in Japan as Valkyria of the Blue Revolution) was released on PlayStation 4 and PlayStation Vita on January 19, 2017 in Japan. It is considered a spin-off, with a storyline separate from the main series, taking place in the fictional country of Jutland. It was released in North America and Europe on June 27, 2017 and June 30, 2017 respectively for the PlayStation 4, PlayStation Vita and Xbox One, making it the first series game to be on a Microsoft console, alongside the PlayStation versions.

Other media

Valkyria Chronicles

Manga
Four manga adaptations have been published based on the first game. The first is Valkyria Chronicles: Wish Your Smile, serialized by Enterbrain's Comic B's Log magazine and centering on two characters made for the manga: Mintz, an orphan and engineer, and Julius Klose, a sniper, with both of them in the Gallian army's militia force. It was illustrated by Kyusei Tokito, and was serialized from November 12, 2008 to January 22, 2010 with two compilation volumes released on May 1, 2009 and March 1, 2010.

The second manga, titled Valkyria Chronicles: Gallian Chronicles, was illustrated by En Kito. Similar to the anime, it is a loose adaptation of the original video game, with some story details diverging from the source material. It was serialized by Kadokawa Shoten from November 26, 2008 to March 26, 2010 in Comp Ace magazine and later compiled in four volumes.

The third manga is Valkyria Chronicles: Anthology Comic, published by the Bros Comics EX comic label on December 28, 2009 in one volume.

The fourth manga is Valkyria Chronicles: 4-koma Anthology, published by the Bros Comics EX comic label on March 10, 2010 in one volume.

Anime

The anime adaptation of the first game premiered on April 4, 2009 and was produced by Aniplex's A-1 Pictures. The series was directed by Yasutaka Yamamoto and written by Michiko Yokote under the Project Valkyria Group. Valkyria Chronicles was aired on Animax, Tokyo MX, MBS, CBC, Chiba TV, Television Kanagawa, Television Hokkaido, BS11, and TVQ Kyushu Broadcasting. Generally following the storyline of the original game, the anime version differs from its source in terms of characterization of main players such as Alicia, and introduces a character unique to the anime, Ramal Valt. While retaining elements of the CANVAS Engine's look, the characters were redesigned for the anime by Atsuko Watanabe.

Overseas, the anime is aired in India on September 19, 2022 via Zee TV.

The original score for the anime is composed and conducted by the game's composer Hitoshi Sakimoto and performed by the Czech Film Orchestra. The first opening theme song, "Asu e no Kizuna" was performed by Animax Anison Grand Prix winner Catherine St. Onge, under her chosen moniker of Himeka. A CD single of the song was released on May 27, 2009. The first ending theme,  was sung by the band Pe'zmoku with a CD single released on May 27, 2009 in a regular and special edition. Maria performed the series's second opening theme, which was used from the 14th episode on. The second ending song, was sung by Hikari Inoue beginning from Episode 14 until Episode 25. Episode 26's ending song was "Brightest Morning", also performed by Hikari Inoue. CD singles for "Kanashimi Rensa" and "Hitotsu no Negai" were released on August 12, 2009 and August 5, 2009.

Region 2 DVDs of all 26 episodes were released across nine volumes, beginning on August 5, 2009, and concluding on April 7, 2010.

Drama CD
Two Valkyria Chronicles Drama CDs have been released. The first was released on July 24, 2009, and the second was released on October 7, 2009.

Valkyria Chronicles II

Three manga adaptations of the second game were released by Sega in Japan.

The first volume was published in January 2011 and the second volume was published on May 27, 2011.

The next manga is called Valkyria Chronicles II (戦場のヴァルキュリア2, Senjō no Varukyuria 2). The story was written by Daiki Saito and the artwork was done by Watari. It was serialised in  Comp Ace from October 2010 to September 2011, and its storyline is loosely based on the game, with emphasis on the relationship between Avan and his brother. The first volume was published on January 26, 2011 and the second volume was published in September 2011.

Another manga, named Valkyria Chronicles II: Our Only Days (戦場のヴァルキュリア2 -our only days-, Senjō no Varukyuria 2 -our only days-), was illustrated by Mekki Kuroyama and was serialised as a webcomic by comic B's-LOG. The story is focused on Zeri and his changing relationships with his schoolmates over the course of the events of the game. The first volume was published on January 31, 2011 and the second volume in September 2011.

Japanese band Chemistry performed the theme song of the game, "Our Story". It was released  as part of their album "Regeneration" on February 24, 2010.

Valkyria Chronicles III

Anime
Valkyria Chronicles III was adapted into a two-episode original video animation series in the same year of its release. Titled , it was originally released through PlayStation Network and Qriocity between April and May 2011. The initially-planned release and availability period needed to be extended due to a stoppage to PSN during the early summer of that year. It later released for DVD on June 29 and August 31, 2011, with separate "Black" and "Blue" editions being available for purchase. The anime is set during the latter half of Valkyria Chronicles III, detailing a mission by the Nameless against their Imperial rivals Calamity Raven. The anime was first announced in November 2010. It was developed by A-1 Pictures, produced by Shinji Motoyama, directed by Nobuhiro Kondō, and written by Hiroshi Ōnogi. Sakimoto's music for the game was used in the anime.

The anime's title was inspired by the principal purpose of the Nameless: to suffer in battle for the goals of others. A subtitle attached to the project during development was "The Road to Kubinka", which referenced the Kubinka Tank Museum in Moscow. The game's main theme was how the characters regained their sense of self when stripped of their names and identities, along with general themes focused on war and its consequences. While making the anime, the production team were told by Sega to make it as realistic as possible, with the consequence that the team did extensive research into aspects such as what happened when vehicles like tanks were overturned or damaged. Due to it being along the same timeline as the original game and its anime television adaptation, the cast of Valkyria Chronicles could make appearances, which pleased the team. The opening theme, was sung by Japanese singer Faylan. The ending theme, was sung by Minami Kuribayashi. Both songs' lyrics were written by their respective artists.

Manga
Two manga adaptations were serialized between 2011 and 2012, following each of the game's main female protagonists, Imca and Riela.

Reception

Valkyria Chronicles series has had a generally positive reception. The original Valkyria Chronicles won numerous awards, including Strategy Game of the Year from GameSpy.

By 2015, Valkyria Chronicles sold over 500,000 copies on Steam, exceeding expectations, and over 141,589 copies on the PlayStation 3. The second game was the second best-selling video game in Japan during its release week, selling 94,000 copies. The third game sold approximately 100,000 units during its premier week, faring better than its predecessors. During its initial March 2018 release on PS4, the fourth game sold 76,778 physical copies within its first three weeks in Japan. After its release on the Switch in September 2018, the game sold 5,596 physical copies within its first week in Japan.

See also
Skies of Arcadia

Notes

References

 
A-1 Pictures
Alternate history video games
Anime television series based on video games
Enterbrain manga
Video games about bomb disposal
Kadokawa Shoten manga
Manga based on video games
Multiplayer and single-player video games
Role-playing video games
Sega Games franchises
Shōnen manga
Tactical role-playing video games
Tactical role-playing video games by series
Video game franchises introduced in 2008